Charles Michel (born 1975) is a Belgian politician and current President of the European Council.

Charles Michel may also refer to:
 Charles Michel (ophthalmologist), American ophthalmologist
 Charles D. Michel, U.S. Coast Guard vice admiral

Subjects with the first name Charles Michel or a variation thereof include:
 Charles-Michel de l'Épée
 Charles Michel de Langlade

See also
 Charles Michels (Paris Métro)